Defending champion Roger Federer defeated David Ferrer in the final, 6–2, 6–3, 6–2 to win the singles tennis title at the 2007 Tennis Masters Cup. It was his fourth Tour Finals title.

Future six-time champion Novak Djokovic made his tournament debut; he was eliminated in the round-robin stage.

Seeds

Alternates

Draw

Finals

Red group
Standings are determined by: 1. number of wins; 2. number of matches; 3. in two-players-ties, head-to-head records; 4. in three-players-ties, percentage of sets won, or of games won; 5. steering-committee decision.

Gold group
Standings are determined by: 1. number of wins; 2. number of matches; 3. in two-players-ties, head-to-head records; 4. in three-players-ties, percentage of sets won, or of games won; 5. steering-committee decision.

See also
ATP World Tour Finals appearances

External links
Draw

Singles